Eduardo del Pino Vicente is a Spanish writer and journalist. He was named "vecino ejemplar" for the XVII Semana Cultural del Casco Histórico de Almería. A new municipal library in Almeria will be named as Eduardo D. Vicente by CSIF.

He wrote about the franquism in Almeria in his works Almería, Memoria Compartida, Almas de Barrio and Almería, Los Años vividos.

References

External links 
 

20th-century births
Writers from Andalusia
Spanish journalists
Living people
Year of birth missing (living people)